Enn Murdmaa (also Ernst or Enn Martinson; 21 December 1874 Käru Parish (now Türi Parish), Kreis Pernau – 9 January 1957 Tallinn) was an Estonian politician. He was a member of I Riigikogu.

References

1874 births
1957 deaths
People from Türi Parish
People from Kreis Pernau
Estonian Social Democratic Workers' Party politicians
Estonian Socialist Workers' Party politicians
Patriotic League (Estonia) politicians
Members of the Riigikogu, 1920–1923
Members of the Riigikogu, 1923–1926